Obhishopto Nighty is a 2014 Indian Bengali Adult comedy-thriller film directed by Birsa Dasgupta and produced by Shrikant Mohta under the banner of Shree Venkatesh Films.

Plot 
The story of this film revolves around a cursed nightie which changes hands in a logical manner, not magically. The original owner of the nightie had experienced unfulfilled love, which ultimately led to a curse on it.

A wannabe actress comes to Kolkata from a village in pursue of her career. She can cross all limits in order to become successful. She uses that nightie for seducing producers and she doesn't regret in what she is doing. The events that take place later form the climax of the story.

Cast 
 Paoli Dam as Monica
 Indraneil Sengupta as Raja/Alok
 Parambrata Chatterjee as Aparesh aka Apu
 Tanusree Chakraborty as Brishti/Apsara
 Rahul Banerjee as Boishakh
 Priyanka Sarkar as Jumela 'Jhumi'
 Neel Mukherjee as Parimal (Censor Board Chief)
 Debaloy Bhattacharya as modhu da or 'gossip queen modhu'
 Bhaskar Banerjee as Bimal Hore
 Paran Bandyopadhyay as Manik Babu (Censor Board Member)
 Locket Chatterjee as Suchhanda (Parimal's wife)
 Mir Afsar Ali
 Laboni Sarkar as Bonolakshmi Tagore aka 'Bonu'
 Jojo as Miss Boshikoron
 Tanima Sen as Parimal's mother
 Sudeshna Roy as Kaushalya Sarbanam (Censor Board Member)
 Dev in a cameo appearance

Soundtrack 

Indraadip Das Gupta was roped in to compose the film score of Obhishopto Nighty.

References

External links
 

2014 films
Films directed by Birsa Dasgupta
Bengali-language Indian films
2010s Bengali-language films
Films scored by Indradeep Dasgupta